Qunchupata (Quechua qunchu muddy, pata step, bank of a river, "muddy step" or "muddy bank",  Hispanicized spelling Conchupata) is a mountain in the Andes of Peru, about  high. It is located in the Junín Region, Yauli Province, Marcapomacocha District, and in the Lima Region, Huarochirí Province, Chicla District. Qunchupata lies southwest of Anta Q'asa and Quriqucha and southeast of Yana Ulla. It is situated north of the Hatun Uqhu valley (Quechua for "big swamp", Hispanicized Jatun Ogo).

References

Mountains of Peru
Mountains of Lima Region
Mountains of Junín Region